Nümbrecht is a municipality in the Oberbergischer Kreis, in North Rhine-Westphalia, Germany. It is a health resort, known for its good climate.

Geography
Nümbrecht is located about 40 km east of Cologne.

Neighbouring places

Division of the town

History of the community Nümbrecht
1131 the place the first time was mentioned documentary namely in the " papal possession confirmation for the inhabitant of Bonn Saint Cassiusstift " (Documentary first namings of Oberbergischer places by Klaus Pampus).

Manner of writing of the first naming: Nuenbret

Regarding the development of Nümbrecht findings belay that since the stone time people in this zone have lived. Broken pieces of clay already refer to early trade relations. However the story of the community begins firstly in the early Middle Ages.

600–700 The first settlements begin in the area Oberberg.

Between 768 and 918 Probably Nümbrecht already exists as a settlement. (Nümbrecht means: measured district for a new settlement)

955 Probably the year of construction of the Evangelic Church Nümbrecht.

1131 First authentic mentions of the settlement Nümbrecht.

Between 900 and 1200 The settlement Marienberghausen arises.

1 December 1264 With the acceptance of the county of Sayn by Gottfried I begins the story of the domination by Homburg.

1268–76 Gottfried I builds the "Castle Homburg" as his residence.

1359 At that time the count of Sayn marries the daughter of the last count of Wittgenstein and expands its name to "of Sayn count to Wittgenstein".

1665 The chapel of Marienberghausen is completed to a church, that has retained its form until today.

1743 The Homburgische characteristic dynasty is gone out, the domination falls to the house Sayn-Wittgenstein-Berleburg.

1792 Christian Heinrich, count of Sayn-Wittgenstein-Berleburg is raised in the sovereign state.

1806 Son Friedrich Albert loses the official power as a sovereign, because of the foundation of the Rhine alliance. After 530 years the Homburgian government is over.

1808 Both Marien Nümbrecht and Marienberghausen are established and are incorporated into the Napoleonic grand duchy Berg.

1813 The domination of the Frenchmen is concluded, and the Marien, renamed in mayor offices, stand under Prussian supremacy.

1845 The Rhine local code is released. On this base the first municipal council at Nümbrecht and also at Marienberghausen can be chosen.

1933 Government falls into the hands of members of the NSDAP, and anxiety and arbitrariness dominate Nümbrecht for 12 years.

1946 Democratic order is restored and a new municipal council is chosen.

1968 The administration of both municipalities Nümbrecht and Marienberghausen are joined.

1969 With the taking effect of the "law about the reorganisation of the Oberbergischen Kreis" the today's large community arises from Marienberghausen and Nümbrecht.

1973 Nümbrecht receives from the minister of work, health and social duties the national recognition as an air spa.

1987 the national recognition as a well-being climatic spa. The numerous cure and leisure time arrangements are developed further and supplemented.

1992 The high school in Nümbrecht is founded.

1994 Founding of the Sophie Scholl school.

1995 Opening the Rhein-Sieg clinic - departments of Orthopedics and neurology - in Höhenstrasse in Nümbrecht.

2003 as the first local authority district in North Rhine-Westphalia Nümbrecht with the environmental roof brand Viabono (brand name for environment-friendly tourism) was distinguished. In addition, Nümbrecht was classed as a remedial-climatic health resort of the Premium Class.

The coat of arms of Nümbrecht
The arms were granted on 4 January 1936 and again in 1969.

The arms are identical to the arms of the Homburg Estate, a possession of the Counts of Sayn-Wittgenstein-Berleburg. The castle is also used in the arms of the district. The Homburg is situated in the municipality. Above the left tower is the arms of the Counts themselves.

Culture

Art Society of Nümbrecht

Since 1983 the Nümbrechter art association exists.
Various exhibitions take place in the house of the art in Nümbrecht. The sculptures are a present of the art association of Nümbrecht to the municipality of Nümbrecht to the embellishment of the health resort.

Sculpture
The sculptures are a present from the art association of Nümbrecht to the municipality of Nümbrecht. They are intended to embellish the health resort.

 In 1983 "The boy with putting" called "Helmut". This sculpture was created by Prof. Dr. Paschke from Düsseldorf. She stands on the pond place.
 In 1996 The sculpture "The transitoriness" stands since 1996 on the churchyard of the Ev church. It was provided by the Mühlheimer sculptor Georg Weber.
 In 2003 "of The cornerstones', altar cross in the Ev church. Stone, bronze, gold leaf of Kassiel collier, Berlin [donated from limbs of the Ev church municipality]
 In 2005 "a dream' The piece of art of the sculptor living in field Breun Rose Gilissen-Vanmarcke was initiated on Saturday 4 June 2005. The sculpture stands on the small place in old Poststrasse.
 13 May 2006 sculpture "nature - recollections of a tree' from sculptor Michael Schwarze in Marktstrasse before the historically significant house Mehlau built in 1746 of the chamberlain's Johann Georg milk bag in Nümbrecht.
 19 April 2008 "strength II" this sculpture was created by the artist Peter Rübsam, she stands before the new-formed city hall square.
 28 September 2009 metal Sculpture of Rose Gilissen. This sculpture is a loan to the art association Nümbrecht. She stands in the health resort park of Nümbrecht below the column well.

Sights

Watchtower
The 30-metre high watchtower at the "Lindchen" in Nümbrecht has 154 steps; the top of the tower is 371 m above sea level. From the top, one can see the Rhine, the Siebengebirge mountain range and even as far as the Rothaargebirge mountain range.

Amiger tunnel
This iron ore mining tunnel known as the Amiger tunnel is approximately 200 to 300 years old. The Amiger tunnel is situated in a forest area called "In the Goldkaule", below the "Alfred Lang" hut and the watchtower. The tunnel is approximately 20 meters long. However, according to local legends, the tunnel goes as far as the village Ödinghausen. Today the entry to the tunnel is shut off by a grating and only the bats know where the tunnel leads...

Benroth
The "ecovillage" Benroth is about five kilometers from Nümbrecht. The conversion of Benroth into an "ecological village of the future" required a few smaller and larger measures, such as the installation of a moist biotope and drystone-wallings. The one-hour tour "ecomile" through the village allows an insight into the projects.

Half timbering

There are a number of well-preserved half-timbering houses in the small village Bruch northeast of Nümbrecht. Most of them date back to the 19th century. Some of them were built on the foundation walls of the previous houses.

Remarkable rocks
Near Nümbrecht, small quartzite monadnocks from the Devonian period (approximately 360 million years ago) were exposed by erosion of softer sedimentary rock. Crinoids ("sea lily") and brachiopod fossils have been discovered here (so they are neither erratic blocks from the ice age nor meteorites, as was formerly believed).

Witches' ponds

Two ponds below the nearby village of Spreitgen are known as Hexenweiher ("witches' ponds"). It is not known whether the name derives from actual witchcraft trials by dunking during the Middle Ages. (In these trials the witches were thrown into a pond with their hands cuffed and their feet tied together. If they went under and drowned, they were considered to be innocent. If they survived they were proven to be a witch and often burnt.) Castle Homburg is a historic site of witchcraft trials. In a trial on 14 September 1631, for example, six women were accused of being witches. Because they confessed, they were given mercy and beheaded instead of being burnt alive.

Churches

The 1000-year-old church next to the castle in Nümbrecht is one of the most interesting sacral buildings of the area: the tower was built in Romanesque style, the romanesque part of the interior features massive medieval pillars and reinforcing arches. The ribbed structure of the apses is typical of Gothic style. Flat vaults were added at the end of the 17th century. The top construction of the tower and the altar reflects Baroque architecture.

The church "Bunte Kerke" in Marienberghausen features medieval wall paintings. The building was changed and reconstructed several times and thus lost its original appearance of a typical fortified church. The west tower is all that is left from the original 12th-century building. The late Gothic paintings in the interior are preserved however. The paintings had been painted over during the
Protestant Reformation period and they surfaced when the organ was renovated in 1910. Only a couple of gothic wall paintings in the area are preserved to this day.

Marienberghausen

In both 1969 and 1991 Marienberghausen won the German federal competition "Unser Dorf soll schöner werden" ("Our village shall become more beautiful"). It is also the birthplace of the opera Hänsel und Gretel, composed here by Engelbert Humperdinck and also first performed here.

Mail coach

The "Oberbergische Postkutsche", a mail coach, runs between Nümbrecht and Wiehl every Friday, Saturday and Sunday from May to the end of October. It is a reproduction of the mail coach of the Imperial Post Office around 1871.

Homburg Castle

Health resort park

Column well in the health resort park

The column well fountain in the health resort park was created by sculptor Michael Schwarze. It was built for the horticultural show (Landesgartenschau) held in Nürmbrecht in 1974. The figures of the well symbolize the age-old will of humans to free themselves from obligations of life.
The female figures are the symbols of beauty and fertility, the fists express force and assertiveness. The hand is an indication of understanding and work. The male leg stands for progress and conquest.

Berlin place

The Berlin bear is a present of the Senate of Berlin. He was put up shortly before the land garden show in 1974 in the health resort park. Berlin citizens could spend a free vacation in Nümbrecht, this was promoted by the country of North Rhine-Westphalia.

Special supplies of the health resort

 Light festival in the health resort park, always on the 2nd week-end in July
 Christmassy work art market, the last week-end before the 1st Advent
 Health resort concerts in the health resort hall or Rhine Sieg clinic (Rhein-Sieg-Klinik, named after the two rivers), Sunday 15.00 o'clock

Industry
In the municipality 3 industrial zones are namely in Elsenroth - Gaderoth and in Breunfeld. The most different companies are resident there.

The biggest employer in municipality is the SARSTEDT Verwaltungs AG with her factories in village Rommelsdorf and Winterborn. The company develops, produces and sells machines and consumable material for medicine and science. The setting up followed in the year 1961 and occupies nowadays 2,250 employees worldwide.

Just as is the KABE LABORTECHNIK GmbH in Elsenroth a bigger medicine technology company. The setting up followed in the year 1983. It develops, produces and sells machines and consumable material for medicine.

Recreation

Clubs and societies
Heimatverein Nümbrecht
DLRG
Senioreninsel
Ballonsportclub
Karateverein
Landfrauenverein
BürgerBus - Verein
 Bürgerzentrum e.V.
Partnerschaftsverein
Kneipp-Verein
Homburger Bienenzuchtverein
Aktionsgemeinschaft
Sportfischen e. V
Handwerkerverein
Motorsportclub Nümbrecht e. V.  im ADAC
SSV Homburg-Nümbrecht
Freiwillige Feuerwehr Nümbrecht
TC Blau-Gelb Nümbrecht e. V.
MGV Nümbrecht
Förderkreis Kultur Nümbrecht e. V
Partnerschaftsverein Nümbrecht-Gouvieux
Partnerschaftsverein Nümbrecht-Megliot
Kinderchor - Homburger Spatzen
Mennoniten-Brüdergemeinde e. V. (Evangelische Freikirche)

Bicycle lane

3 Subjects-engaged bicycle tours exist in municipality Nümbrecht.

Family tour
High tour
  Half-timbered tour

Schools in the municipality

 Gemeinschaftsgrund- und Hauptschulen (elementary schools)
 Sophie-Scholl-Realschule Nümbrecht (secondary modern)
 Gymnasium Nümbrecht
 Educational site - House Nümbrecht

Natives of the municipality
 Karl Heckmann, regional historian (1866–1943)
 Otto Kaufmann, regional historian († 1985)
 Carl Koch (1892–1962), film director
 Thomas Lang (1967–), author
 Robert Ley (1890–1945), leading Nazi Party member
 Walter Peitgen (1915–1990), former mayor
 Heinz-Otto Peitgen (1945–), mathematician
 Julia Prejmerean-Aston (1952–), painter

Congregations

 Evangelical Lutheran church municipality Nümbrecht.
 Evangelical Lutheran church municipality Marienberghausen.
 Roman Catholic church municipality Nümbrecht, Hl. Spirit.

Memorials
 Warrior's monument for the dead people of 1. and 2. world war.
 The memorial in the Jewish cemetery was initiated on 28 May 1995. It's originated with the help of an engaged working group in the municipality with collaboration with the sculptress Marianne Roetzel from Harscheid. On old cobble stones there lies a stone tablet, this is complemented with seven columns. They symbolize Menora, the 7-armed candlestick.
 Stone tablet as a recollection of the former Jewish synagogue on the modern village square.

Social facilities

 Old care home Engelsstift the Theodor Fliedner foundation.
 Blind home - Ernst-Christoffel home.
 Social welfare work - station Nümbrecht of the prot. church municipality Nümbrecht.

Twin towns
 Gouvieux (France) since 1960
 Mateh Yehuda in Israel, since 8. November 2008

Literature
 Marion Geldmacher, The beginnings of Nümbrecht and Homburg, writings to Rheini history Bd. 4, Cologne 1980
 Karl Heckman, History of the former realm rule Homburg at the Mark, Bonn 1939
 Heinrich Schild, Chronicle of the municipalities Nümbrecht and Marienberghausen, Nümbrecht 1977

References

External links

 Municipality Nümbrecht 
 Catholic church municipality Nümbrecht/Waldbröl  
 Ev. church Nümbrecht 
 Malzhagen 
 Grammar school Nümbrecht 
 Albert Schweitzer Elementary education Nümbrecht 
 Elementary education Marienberghausen 
 Elementary education Auf dem Höchsten 
 Municipality library 
 Art society Nümbrecht 
 History of the Homburgischen Gemeinden 

Oberbergischer Kreis